Edward Bickford Patton (born February 18, 1966 in New York City) is an American rower. He graduated from Brown University in 1988, where he helped keep the crew ranked in the top three in the US.

References

External links
 
 

1966 births
Living people
American male rowers
Sportspeople from New York City
Rowers at the 1988 Summer Olympics
Olympic bronze medalists for the United States in rowing
World Rowing Championships medalists for the United States
Medalists at the 1988 Summer Olympics

Brown Bears rowers